William Findlay may refer to:
William Findlay (governor) (1768–1846), governor of Pennsylvania
William Findlay (cricketer) (1880–1953), English cricketer and administrator
William Findlay (soccer) (1904–1981), Scottish-born American footballer
W. H. Findlay (1911–2006), Scottish photographer
Willie Findlay (1926–2001), Scottish footballer
Bill Findlay (born 1913), Australian rules footballer
Bill Findlay (footballer) (1900–1949), Scottish footballer
Bill Findlay (writer) (1947–2005), translator of drama into Scots
Billy Findlay (born 1970), Scottish footballer

See also 
William Findley (1741–1821), American farmer and politician
William Finley (disambiguation)
William Finlay (disambiguation)
William Findlay Maclean (1854–1929), Canadian politician
William Findlay Rogers (1820–1899), U.S. Representative